Bad Endorf is a municipality in the district of Rosenheim in Bavaria in Germany. The relatively small town is located about 15 km outside of Rosenheim and is in close proximity to the Chiemsee lake and its larger shore towns, Prien, Gstadt, and Seebruck.

The town is home to a large health spa and gym, as well as the German Federal Police winter sports training center which is famous for producing multiple medal winners at the Winter Olympics such as female speed skater Claudia Pechstein.

Bad Endorf has one main bus station and several minor ones located around the town which can take travelers to any of the neighboring towns as well as Munich. The town also has a Deutsche Bahn railway station on the Rosenheim–Salzburg line with service to minor towns in the area as well as Rosenheim, Munich, and Salzburg, Austria.

References

Rosenheim (district)
Spa towns in Germany